Willem Aaldert "Wim" Gerlach (24 June 1935 – 14 June 2007) is a retired boxer from the Netherlands. He competed at the 1960 and 1964 Summer Olympics in the lightweight and light welterweight classes, respectively, and was eliminated in the first round at both games.

Since 2007, the "Wim Gerlach Memorial" competition is carried out annually in late November in Delfzijl.

References

1935 births
2007 deaths
Boxers at the 1964 Summer Olympics
Boxers at the 1960 Summer Olympics
Olympic boxers of the Netherlands
Sportspeople from Groningen (city)
Lightweight boxers
Light-welterweight boxers
Dutch male boxers